Ko Phi Phi Don is the largest of the islands in the Ko Phi Phi archipelago, in Thailand. Phi Phi Don is 9.73 km2 (3.76 mi2): 8 kilometres (5.0 miles) in length and 3.5 kilometres (2.2 miles) wide. Part of the islands are administratively part of Ao Nang in Krabi Province. It is the only island in the group with permanent inhabitants, although most are temporary workers servicing the tourist trade.

Like the other islands in the archipelago, Phi Phi Don is a non-volcanic island largely made of limestone. It is almost separated into two islands, but a strand of flat land connects them. On this strand lies the largest settlement on the island, as well as most of the resorts.

Villages
Ban Laem Tong
Laem Tong
Ban Ton Sai
Hat Yao

2004 tsunami

More than 1,000 people died 26 December 2004 when a tsunami struck the island.

Lohdalum Bay was hit the hardest, with the majority of the bungalows and restaurants along the beach destroyed. There is a memorial for those killed in the tsunami on the beach facing Lohdalum Bay. Every year there is a small memorial service where family members and friends come to pay their respects and talk about those they lost. A moment of silence is observed at the time the tsunami hit.

There were three waves: the first one flooded Lohdalum Bay, the second destroyed all of the wooden buildings and the third and largest ruined stone buildings as if they were made of sand. The whole tsunami lasted for only three minutes (from 10:29–10:32) but it nearly destroyed the whole island.

Environment

Most of the Phi Phi Islands are in a protected marine reserve, part of Hat Noppharat Thara-Mu Ko Phi Phi National Park. But parts of Phi Phi Don are outside the park's jurisdiction, and under the jurisdiction of, and funded by, the Ao Nang Tambon Administrative Organisation (TAO). Its budget is based on the number of permanent, registered residents and takes no account of visitors. The island has very few documented residents. Most who service the tourist trade are registered residents elsewhere in Thailand. The number of residents, permanent and temporary, is dwarfed by the number of visitors. Thus the Ao Nang TAO allocates only about 170 million baht per year to the Phi Phis. Underfunding has contributed to serious environmental issues.

Solid waste
The Phi Phi Islands in 2014 produced an average of 25 tonnes of solid waste a day, jumping to 40 tonnes during the high season that runs roughly from November to April. All tourists arriving on the island pay a 20 baht fee at Ton Sai Pier to assist in "keeping Ko Phi Phi clean". The money, up to 20,000 baht per day (2014), is then paid to a private company to haul roughly 20 tonnes of rubbish from the island daily to Krabi for disposal. In 2014, the Ao Nang TAO paid 600,000 baht per month for this service. Collections from visitors amount to only about a third of the sum needed to effectively handle the solid waste generated.

Water: potable and waste
According to a research team from Kasetsart University's Faculty of Engineering, Phi Phi Don suffers from a severe shortage of clean freshwater. The problem stems from the period of low rainfall coinciding with the high tourist season, exacerbated by improper handling of wastewater. During the driest period of the year, from November to April, the island is packed with tourists, causing water demand to spike. There is no rainfall to top up the two freshwater ponds that are the only sources of piped water on the island. The limited supply drives the cost of piped water up, in turn driving businesses to sink wells to tap ground water. This lowers the water table. Lowering aquifer water levels allows seawater to encroach on groundwater. In addition, the island's water treatment plant cannot handle the volume of waste water generated, meaning that excess untreated waste water is flushed into the sea where it also contaminates groundwater. Short of substantial infrastructure investment, the lead Kasetsart researcher recommended that the number of visitors be capped at the carrying capacity of the island: 12,000 to 27,000 people per day. Her recommendation was prefigured in 2015 by a member of Thailand's National Reform Council, who called Phi Phi a "slum" and recommending capping tourist numbers.

See also
 List of islands of Thailand

References

External links

Beaches of Thailand
Geography of Krabi province
Phi Phi Don